KJJM may refer to:

 KJJM (FM), a radio station (100.5 FM) licensed to serve Baker, Montana, United States
 KJJM-LD, a low-power television station (channel 12, virtual 34) licensed to serve Dallas & Mesquite, Texas, United States